"I See Right Through to You" is a song by the Danish eurodance producer DJ Encore featuring the vocals of Danish singer Engelina. It was released as the lead single from DJ Encore's debut album, Intuition, in 2001.

The song served as the theme song to the first season of the reality television show Big Brother Denmark. It peaked at number one in Denmark and at number fifteen in the U.S. on Billboard's Hot Dance Club Songs chart.

Track listing

Personnel
Writing – Andreas Hemmeth, Engelina
Producer – Michael Parsberg, Jakob Stavnstrup, Andreas Hemmeth
Mixing – Michael Parsberg, Jakob Stavnstrup, Andreas Hemmeth
Vocals – Engelina
Mastering – Jan Eliasson

Charts

References

2001 singles
DJ Encore songs
Song recordings produced by Michael Parsberg
Number-one singles in Denmark
Songs written by Engelina
2001 songs